James Reaves is a former professional basketball player.

Reaves was born on April 30, 1982 in Rochester, New York to Milton and Dorthea Reaves. He has two older brothers, Carlos and Kelvin. In 2006, Reaves was inducted to the Greater Rochester High School Basketball Hall of Fame.

High school career
Reaves attended Edison Tech HS in Rochester. In 2000, his senior year, he averaged 25 points and 17 rebounds per game and was named All-Greater Rochester Area High School Boys Player of the Year.

College career
Reaves attended Niagara University on a basketball scholarship. He was named to the MAAC All Rookie team in 2001 and All Conference team in 2002 and was the 2004 MAAC tournament MVP.
2000-2001: Freshman Year
Averaged 7.7 RPG
2001-2002: Sophomore Year
Averaged 10.4 PPG, 8.8 RPG and 1.1 APG
2002-2003: Junior Year
Averaged 11.7 PPG, 8.3 RPG and 2.3 APG
2003-2004: Senior Year
Averaged 11.6 PPG, 9.6 RPG and 1.5 APG

International professional career
2004-2005
BS/Energy Braunschweig (Germany Div. I) & SG FT/MTV Braunschweig (Germany Div. II)
Averaged 22.6 PPG and 9.4 RPG over 17 games for both teams

2005
Tecos del UAG (Liga Nacional de Baloncesto Profesional)
Averaged 13.2 PPG and 7.3 RPG

In 2010-11 he played for Korihait in the Finnish basketball league, Korisliiga.

United States professional career
2005-2006 (ABA)
Led Rochester Razorsharks in PPG with 18.4 and RPG with 7.6 and led team to first ever ABA Championship.

2006 Summer (USBL)
Played 11 games with the Dodge City Legend in USBL, averaging 10.6 PPG and 10.6 RPG. Sat out most of the year with an injured knee

2006-2007
Again played for hometown Rochester Razorsharks. For this season, Reaves was named to represent the Razorsharks in the 2007 ABA All-Star Game.

References

1982 births
Living people
American expatriate basketball people in Finland
American expatriate basketball people in Germany
American expatriate basketball people in Mexico
American expatriate basketball people in Venezuela
ABA All-Star Game players
Barreteros de Zacatecas players
Basketball players from New York (state)
Niagara Purple Eagles men's basketball players
Sportspeople from Rochester, New York
Tecolotes UAG players
Power forwards (basketball)
American men's basketball players